The Hornibrook House is a historic house at 2120 South Louisiana Street in Little Rock, Arkansas.  It is a two-story brick structure, with the irregular massing and projecting gables typical of the Queen Anne style architecture, a Victorian revival style.  Its wraparound porch is festooned with detailed woodwork, with turned posts and balustrade.  A three-story rounded turret stands at one corner of the house, topped by an octagonal roof.  Built in 1888, it is one of the state's finest examples of Queen Anne architecture, with unrivalled exterior and interior detail.  It was built for James Hornibrook, a prominent local businessman.

The house was listed on the National Register of Historic Places in 1974.

See also
National Register of Historic Places listings in Little Rock, Arkansas

References

Houses on the National Register of Historic Places in Arkansas
Victorian architecture in Arkansas
Houses completed in 1888
Houses in Little Rock, Arkansas
National Register of Historic Places in Little Rock, Arkansas
Historic district contributing properties in Arkansas
Gilded Age mansions
Queen Anne architecture in Arkansas